Trescore Cremasco is a comune (municipality) in the province of Cremona in the Italian region Lombardy, located about  east of Milan and about  northwest of Cremona.

Trescore Cremasco borders the following municipalities: Bagnolo Cremasco, Casaletto Vaprio, Crema, Cremosano, Palazzo Pignano, Quintano, Torlino Vimercati, Vaiano Cremasco.

References

External links
 Official website

Cities and towns in Lombardy